Enteractinococcus is a Gram-positive genus of bacteria from the family Micrococcaceae.

References

Micrococcaceae
Bacteria genera